Estadio Olímpico Universitario is a multi-purpose stadium located inside Ciudad Universitaria in Mexico City. It was built in 1952 and at that time was the largest stadium in Mexico. This stadium has a capacity of 72,000. The first major event held in the stadium was the 1955 Pan American Games. During the 1950s and the 1960s this stadium was used mostly for college American football matches between the largest Mexican public universities at the time: UNAM and IPN. From the late 1950s it was used for football matches, some American football matches and athletics. American architect Frank Lloyd Wright called it "the most important building in the modern America".

The Olímpico Universitario hosted the 1968 Summer Olympics; for the event the seating capacity was increased from 70,000 to 83,700 spectators (without substantially modifying the original structure) to cover the IOC requirements for an Olympic stadium. It was the location of the track and field competitions, equestrian events, certain association football matches, the arrival of the marathon and the opening and closing ceremonies. This was the Olympics in which Tommie Smith and John Carlos protested against the treatment of African Americans in the United States by performing a black power salute during the medal ceremony for the 200 metres (which occurred in this stadium). The stadium also hosted the track and field events at the 1975 Pan American Games.

The stadium hosted four games of the 1986 FIFA World Cup, but the final match was played in the bigger Estadio Azteca in Mexico City.

The Tartan track was the first All-weather running track to be used in the Olympics. Such a track is now a requirement.

During the 2nd leg of the Liga MX final between Universidad Nacional and América, two hours before the start of the game, the building looked at its maximum capacity, but outside there was still a crowd of at least 30 thousand more people. At that time, Ciudad Universitaria did not have fences that surrounded it and it was easy to get to the access tunnels of the stadium. During the attempt of the fans to get to the pitch in one of the access tunnels (the tunnel number 29) a number of people got stuck and ended with the death of 11 people and several others injured.  

Currently, it is the home stadium of Universidad Nacional and American football team Pumas CU.

This sport facility is part of the Ciudad Universitaria ("University City"), the main campus of the UNAM.

Architecture and art of the stadium 

It is the work of architects Augusto Pérez, Raúl Salinas and Jorge Bravo Moro. The "Estadio Universitario, original name, was built specifically for the former practice of football.

On the east side of University Olympic Stadium, is a mural by Diego Rivera, called "The University, the Mexican family, peace and youth sports. In the construction of the relief in natural colored stones shows the university shield, with the condor and the eagle on a cactus. Under their wings outstretched, Rivera placed three figures representing the family: the father and the mother giving the dove of peace to his son. At the extremes are two gigantic figures that correspond to some athletes, male and female, who light the torch of Olympic flame. A huge feathered serpent, the symbolic image of the pre-Hispanic god Quetzalcoatl, complements the composition at the bottom.

Diego Rivera had planned to cover the entire outside of the stadium with designs similar to this, but the artist's death prevented him.

The asymmetric shape of the stands of the stadium-side with the more developed west-emphasizes the final composition of the joint project of the University City, which finished off its axis and principal, the stands closest to the Avenida Insurgentes, emphasizes the sense league stadium to the rest of the set.

Much like the Olympic cauldron on top of the Los Angeles Memorial Coliseum peristyle, the upper deck on one sideline is topped by an Olympic cauldron that was installed for the Olympic Games.  The other sideline is topped by a press box.

1986 FIFA World Cup
It hosted 4 matches of the tournament, including a round of 16 match-up.

References

External links

Google Maps satellite photo
StadiumDB images

College American football venues in Mexico
College association football venues in Mexico
Athletics (track and field) venues in Mexico
Estadio Olimpico Universitario
Estadio Olimpico Universitario
Sports venues completed in 1952
Venues of the 1968 Summer Olympics
Olympic athletics venues
Olympic equestrian venues
Football venues in Mexico
Sports venues in Mexico City
Olympic stadiums
1986 FIFA World Cup stadiums
Pan American Games opening ceremony stadiums
Pan American Games athletics venues
1952 establishments in Mexico